Marc Steven Alessi (born July 1976) is an American attorney and entrepreneur from Shoreham, New York, who formerly served in the New York State Assembly. He currently holds positions as Executive Director of Tesla Science at Wardenclyffe, Executive Director of the Business Incubator Association of New York State, Founder/CEO of SynchroPET, and attorney at the firm of Campolo, Middleton & McCormick LLP.

Alessi was born in Brooklyn, New York, and grew up on Long Island. His father, a union printer, emigrated from Italy at the age of nine, and his mother worked and raised six children.

Alessi graduated from SUNY Albany in 1998 with a B.A. in Political Science. He received his J.D. from Touro College Jacob D. Fuchsberg Law Center in 2003 and was admitted to the New York State Bar Association in 2005. Alessi was of counsel with the law firm Jaspan Schlesinger LLP in Garden City, New York, from 2007 to 2015.

Alessi represented the state's 1st district from 2005 to 2010. The district comprised Brookhaven, Riverhead, Southold and Shelter Island. He was chosen to fill this seat, formerly occupied by Patricia Acampora, in a special election held on September 13, 2005. He won re-election in 2006 and 2008 but lost his bid for a third full term in November 2010, defeated by Republican Daniel Losquadro. Prior to his election, Alessi served as the Downstate Director of Intergovernmental Affairs within the Office of the New York State Comptroller from 2001 to 2005.

In 2012 Alessi founded and became the CEO of SynchroPET, a biomedical device company in Ronkonkoma, New York, that manufactures MRI-compatible PET (Positron Emission Tomography) devices for the small animal research and clinical/human imaging markets.

From June 2015 to the present, Alessi has served as counsel to Campolo, Middleton & McCormick, LLP, a full-service law firm established in 2008 that is currently has four offices across Long Island, New York, with clients that range from global corporations to individuals.

He resides in Shoreham, New York, with his wife Gretchen and their daughter and two sons.

Election results
 September 2005 special election, NYS Assembly, 1st AD
{| class="Wikitable"
| Marc Alessi (DEM - IND - WOR) || ... || 6,239
|-
| Michael J. Caracciolo (REP - CON) || ... || 5,705
|}

 November 2006 general election, NYS Assembly, 1st AD
{| class="Wikitable"
| Marc S. Alessi (DEM - IND - WOR) || ... || 24,366
|-
| Daniel J. Panico (REP - CON - STR) || ... || 15,446
|}

 November 2008 general election, NYS Assembly, 1st AD
{| class="Wikitable"
| Marc S. Alessi (DEM - IND - WOR) || ... || 36,680
|-
| James M. Staudenraus (REP - CON) || ... || 24,095
|}

 November 2010 general election, NYS Assembly, 1st AD
{| class="Wikitable"
| Daniel P. Losquadro (REP - CON - STR) || ... || 23,860
|-
| Marc S. Alessi (DEM - IND - WOR) || ... || 22,943
|}

References

External links
Jaspan Schlesinger LLP: Marc S. Alessi

 

1976 births
Living people
Democratic Party members of the New York State Assembly
Politicians from Brooklyn
People from Shoreham, New York
University at Albany, SUNY alumni
Touro Law Center alumni
21st-century American politicians